Collezione Farnesina Experimenta is a bilingual book (Italian and English) that assembles and catalogues the eighty works (reproduced in colour) of the Farnesina Experimenta Art Collection, housed in Palazzo della Farnesina.

Along with exhibitions of the collection that are promoted by the Italian Ministry of Foreign Affairs, the aim of the volume is to valorize and make known contemporary Italian art, by supporting those generations of artists who made names for themselves from the nineties to the year 2000.

The volume
In addition to being a catalogue of the works, the volume contains biographical entries of the artists and four critical essays:
What is its Function?  by Maurizio Calvesi,
Experiments For The Future by Lorenzo Canova,
The Perception Of Young Italian Art by Marco Meneguzzo,
Contemporary Paradigms by Marisa Vescovo,
which reveal how Italian contemporary art still shows a capacity to be reborn, to find a new meaning and new energies for facing the complexity of its own historical moment, by combining elements of the country’s prolific artistic history with the most evolved inclinations of contemporaneity.

Catalogue of the collection
The Farnesina Experimenta Art Collection amplifies the Italian collection of art of Palazzo della Farnesina and represents the current state of art in Italy.
The collection includes works that have been created using the different forms of expression that distinguish contemporary art: from video art to painting, from photography to digital art, from sculpture to drawing to installation.
The eighty works in the collection are by artists from all over Italy.

Artists
 
 Andrea Aquilanti
 Stefano Arienti
 Stefania Aragona
 Matteo Basilè
 Alessandro Bazan
 Angelo Bellobono
 Carlo Benvenuto
 Fausto Bertasa
 Bianco-Valente
 Paola Binante
 Nicola Bolla
 Marco Bolognesi
 Enrica Borghi
 Domenico Borrelli
 Botto & Bruno
 Letizia Cariello
 Francesco Carone
 Gea Casolaro
 Loris Cecchini
 Filippo Centenari
 Francesco Cervelli
 Marco Cingolani
 Marco Colazzo
 Davide Coltro
 Paolo Consorti
 Vittorio Corsini
 Francesco De Grandi
 Fabrice de Nola
 Alberto Di Fabio
 Andrea Di Marco
 Fulvio Di Piazza
 Mauro Di Silvestre
 Stefania Fabrizi
 David Fagioli
 Roberto Falconieri
 Lara Favaretto
 Flavio Favelli
 Emanuela Fiorelli
 Licia Galizia
 Daniele Galliano
 Piero Golia
 Paolo Grassino
 Jonathan Guaitamacchi
 Francesco Impellizzeri
 Laboratorio Saccardi
 Massimo Livadiotti
 Federico Lombardo
 Raffaele Luongo
 Marcello Maloberti
 Andrea Martinelli
 Simone Martinetto
 Andrea Mastrovito
 Luca Matti
 Sabrina Mezzaqui
 Liliana Moro
 Luigi Mulas Debois
 Adriano Nardi
 Andrea Nicodemo
 Davide Nido
 Giorgio Ortona
 Luca Pancrazzi
 Perino & Vele
 Luca Pignatelli
 Paolo Piscitelli
 Laura Pugno
 Pierluigi Pusole
 Paolo Radi
 Mauro Reggio
 Antonio Riello
 Alessandro Scartabello
 Francesco Sena
 Federico Solmi
 Giuseppe Stampone
 Silvano Tessarollo
 Saverio Todaro
 Sabrina Torelli
 Luisa Valentini
 Nicola Verlato
 Marco Verrelli
 Fabio Viale
 Cesare Viel
 Antonello Viola
 Luca Vitone

See also
Farnesina Experimenta Art Collection

Notes and references

Editions
Maurizio Calvesi, Lorenzo Canova, Marco Meneguzzo, Marisa Vescovo, Collezione Farnesina Experimenta, Gangemi Editore, 2008. pp. 232, .

External links
Full record at OPAC SBN website.
Art at the Foreign Ministry at Italian Ministry of Foreign Affairs website.
 Collezione Farnesina at Google Cultural Institute
Book arts
Art exhibitions in Italy